The Early October is the first mixtape released by Air Dubai on October 29, 2008.

Background
In the summer of 2008 rapper Julian Thomas approached rapper/singer Jon Shockness about creating a group under the name Air Dubai. By September 2008 they were in the studio recording the 12 song album that would stand as the base for their eventual progression into a full 7 piece full instrumental band.

On March 13, 2010, Air Dubai announced that The Early October had officially gone out of print.

Track listing

External links
Official site
Facebook page

2008 debut albums
Air Dubai albums